Euchromius vinculellus is a species of moth in the family Crambidae. It is found from France, Spain, Portugal, Italy, Greece and Morocco east to Saudi Arabia, Oman and Afghanistan. It is also found in Niger and Kenya.

The length of the forewings is 13–21 mm. The groundcolour of the forewings is creamy white, densely suffused with ochreous to dark brown scales. The hindwings are light brown to grey-brown with a darkly bordered termen. Adults are on wing in July (Niger) and January (Kenya).

References

Moths described in 1847
Crambinae
Moths of Europe
Moths of Africa
Moths of Asia